Yan Mingyong (born 24 March 1985) is a retired Chinese artistic gymnast. He competed at the 2009 World Artistic Gymnastics Championships in London and won gold, becoming world champion on the still rings event. The following year he returned to the World Championship scene in Rotterdam and at the 2010 World Artistic Gymnastics Championships he won a silver medal in the still rings event alongside the gold medal China's national squad won that year in the team competition.

References 

1985 births
Living people
Chinese male artistic gymnasts
Gymnasts from Shanghai
World champion gymnasts
Medalists at the World Artistic Gymnastics Championships
Asian Games medalists in gymnastics
Asian Games gold medalists for China
Asian Games silver medalists for China
Medalists at the 2010 Asian Games
Gymnasts at the 2010 Asian Games
21st-century Chinese people